Sardar Ahmad is a Pakistani politician who was a member of the Provincial Assembly of Sindh from May 2013 to May 2018.

Early life and education
He was born on 9 November 1933 in Ajmer, India.

He has a degree of Bachelor of Arts and a degree of Master of Arts from Sindh University.

Political career

He was elected to the Provincial Assembly of Sindh as a candidate of Mutahida Quami Movement from Constituency PS-124 KARACHI-XXXVI in 2013 Pakistani general election.

References

Living people
Sindh MPAs 2013–2018
1933 births
Muttahida Qaumi Movement politicians